The word Cushi or Kushi is generally used in the Hebrew Bible to refer to a dark-skinned person of African descent, equivalent to Greek  "Aithíops".

Etymology and biblical use
The word is a derivation of Cush ( Kūš), referring to the ancient Kingdom of Kush which was centered on the Upper Nile and Nubia (modern-day Sudan). Mentioned in the Hebrew Bible, Cushites are considered descendants of Noah's grandson, Cush the son of Ham. In biblical and historical usage, the term "Cushites" (Hamites) refers to individuals of East African origin (Horn of Africa and Sudan).

Modern use
In early Modern Hebrew usage, the term Cushi was used as an unmarked referent to a dark-skinned or red-haired person, without derogatory implications. For example, it is the nickname, or term of endearment, of the Israeli commando of Yemenite extraction, Shimon "Kushi" Rimon (b. 1939).
When William Shakespeare's Othello was first translated to Hebrew in 1874, the hero of the play was named Ithiel the Cushite.

In 2012, Kiryat Arba's Chief Rabbi Dov Lior referred to US President Barack Obama as a "kushi" of the West. In contemporary usage, the term can be regarded as an ethnic slur, akin to the American usage of Nigger.

In 2016, hasidic singer Mordechai Ben David attracted controversy after a video taken at his December 28 concert in Jerusalem, wherein he referred to US President Barack Obama as a kushi, was circulated online.

References

See also
  on Hebrew Wikipedia
Cushitic languages
Zipporah, wife of Moses, depending on interpretation described as "Cushite" in the Bible

Anti-African and anti-black slurs
Anti-black racism in Israel
Ethiopian-Jewish culture in Israel
Hebrew words and phrases